Artemisia is a former municipality on the island of Zakynthos, Ionian Islands, Greece. Since the 2011 local government reform it is part of the municipality Zakynthos, of which it is a municipal unit. It is on the central west coast of the island. It has a land area of 104.890 km² and a 2011 census population of 4,612 inhabitants. Its municipal seat was the town of Machairado (pop. 941). Other large towns are Romiri (605), Lagopodo (483), Ágios Léontas (393), Lagkadákia (357), Koiliomenos (391), and Vougiáto (306).

Subdivisions
The municipal unit Artemisia is subdivided into the following communities (constituent villages in brackets):
Agia Marina
Agioi Pantes
Agios Leontas (Agios Leontas, Fterini)
Fiolitis
Galaro
Gyri
Koiliomenos
Lagkadakia
Lagopodo
Loucha
Machairado
Romiri
Vougiato (Vougiato, Melinado)

References

Populated places in Zakynthos